= Theatertage am See =

Theatre festival in Germany

Theatertage am See is a theatre festival in Germany.
